The 1972–73 Northern Premier League was the fifth season of the Northern Premier League, a regional football league in Northern England, the northern areas of the Midlands and North Wales. The season began on 12 August 1972 and concluded on 4 May 1973.

Overview
The League featured twenty-four teams for the second consecutive season.

Team changes
The following two clubs left the League at the end of the previous season:
Chorley resigned, demoted to Cheshire County League
Kirkby Town relegated to Lancashire Combination

The following two clubs joined the League at the start of the season:
Mossley promoted from Cheshire County League
Barrow not re-elected to Football League Fourth Division

League table

Results

Stadia and locations

Cup results

Challenge Cup

Northern Premier League Shield

Between Champions of NPL Premier Division and Winners of the NPL Cup.

FA Cup

Out of the twenty-four clubs from the Northern Premier League, only three teams reached the second round:

Second Round

FA Trophy

Out of the twenty-four clubs from the Northern Premier League, five teams reached the fourth round:

Fourth Round

Semi-finals

Final

End of the season
At the end of the fifth season of the Northern Premier League none of the teams put forward for election received enough votes to be promoted to the Football League.  Ellesmere Port Town resigned the league.

Football League elections
Alongside the four Football League teams facing re-election, a total of ten non-League teams applied for election, two of which were from the Northern Premier League.  All four Football League teams were re-elected.

Promotion and relegation
The following club left the League at the end of the season:
Ellesmere Port Town resigned, demoted to Lancashire Combination

The following club joined the League the following season:
Buxton promoted from Cheshire County League

References

External links
 Northern Premier League official website
 Northern Premier League tables at RSSSF
 Football Club History Database

Northern Premier League seasons
5